Manfred Bolliger (born  in Bern) is a Swiss wheelchair curler.

He participated in the 2006 and 2010 Winter Paralympics where Swiss team finished on sixth and seventh places respectively.

Teams

References

External links 

Profile at the Official Website for the 2010 Winter Paralympics in Vancouver

Living people
1962 births
Sportspeople from Bern
Swiss male curlers
Swiss wheelchair curlers
Paralympic wheelchair curlers of Switzerland
Wheelchair curlers at the 2006 Winter Paralympics
Wheelchair curlers at the 2010 Winter Paralympics
World wheelchair curling champions
Swiss wheelchair curling champions